Ghost Corps, Inc. is an American co-production company formed in March 2015 to oversee the Ghostbusters media franchise and as a stock exchange for the Ghostbusters brand. It is a division of Sony Pictures Entertainment's Columbia Pictures and as of January 2021 currently no longer functions as a stock exchange C-Corporation business but is currently still active as a PR office on the Sony Pictures lot maintaining management of its online pages and productions related to the Ghostbusters brand.

History
The company was formed in March 2015 by Sony Pictures Entertainment and Columbia Pictures in order to create a Ghostbusters cinematic universe and expand the Ghostbusters brand into films, television series, and merchandise. The company is currently headed by Jason Reitman and Dan Aykroyd, along with Montecito Picture Company partners Tom Pollock and Joe Medjuck.

Projects
The company's first project was a live-action reboot with a female-oriented cast. Ghostbusters directed by Paul Feig, was released on July 15, 2016.

Its second project, a sequel to the original Ghostbusters films, titled Ghostbusters: Afterlife was announced by Sony Pictures and Ghost Corps. It was released in theaters on November 19, 2021. The film takes  place in the original timeline set by the first two films. Jason Reitman, the son of Ghostbusters' original director Ivan Reitman, directed the sequel. A teaser trailer was released on January 14, 2019.

A follow up sequel to Ghostbusters: Afterlife was announced in April 2022 as the company's third project. It is currently scheduled for release on December 20, 2023.

Filmography

References

External links
 

Columbia Pictures
Ghostbusters
Sony Pictures Entertainment
Mass media companies established in 2015